Srby may refer to the following places in the Czech Republic:

 Srby (Domažlice District)
 Srby (Plzeň-South District)